The 24th Golden Bell Awards was held on 9 April 1989 at the National Theater Hall in Taipei, Taiwan. The ceremony was broadcast by Chinese Television System (CTS).

Winners

References

1989
1989 in Taiwan